Motarzyn  (German: Muttrin) is a village in the administrative district of Gmina Tychowo, within Białogard County, West Pomeranian Voivodeship, in north-western Poland.

In 2008 the population of the village was just over 100.

Notable residents
 Heinrich Beitzke (1798–1867), German historian

See also
History of Pomerania

References

Motarzyn